Polizeiruf 110 ("Police call 110") is a long-running German-language detective television series likened to Poirot. The name links to the emergency telephone number of the Volkspolizei. The first episode was broadcast 27 June 1971 in the German Democratic Republic (GDR), and after the dissolution of Deutscher Fernsehfunk the series was picked up by ARD. It was originally created as a counterpart to the West German series Tatort, and quickly became a public favorite.

In contrast with other television crime series in which killings are practically the primary focus, while Tatort handled homicide cases, the cases handled in the GDR TV's Polizeiruf were more often more frequent crimes such as domestic violence, extortion, fraud, theft and juvenile delinquency, as well as alcoholism, child abuse and rape. Contrary to Tatort, which concentrated on the primary characters and their private lives, police procedure was the center of attention of Polizeiruf, especially in the earlier episodes. The scriptwriters attached particular importance to the representation of the criminal and his state of mind, as well as the context of the crime. Many episodes aimed to teach and enlighten the audience about what does and what does not constitute appropriate behaviour and appropriate thought, rather than just to entertain. Polizeiruf was one of the few broadcasts by GDR media in which the real problems and difficulties of the supposedly more advanced socialist society could be displayed and discussed to some extent, albeit in a fictionalized and pedagogicalized environment.

In 1990 the episode  was produced as a crossover with the West German Tatort crime series, in which Horst Schimanski coworked with Hauptmann Peter Fuchs and Oberleutnant Thomas Grawe in a case of homicide and smuggling committed by former members of the Stasi.

After the end of the GDR, the series was taken over by the ARD as a franchise similar to the Tatort series. The local members of the ARD produce their own episodes, which are aired by the ARD. West German settings and characters came into the show. Parallel to the Tatort series, the ORF joined the Polizeiruf franchise with its own productions. Consequently, those episodes are renamed Polizeiruf 133 because of the different emergency telephone number in Austria, while the West German emergency call uses the same number as the East German. The ARD's Polizeiruf deals mostly with murders and homicides, while the focus has been more on entertainment rather than any teaching or enlightening. More emphasis was put on the characters and personal lives of the detectives, and there has been relatively little difference overall between the newer Polizeiruf episodes and the contemporary Tatort episodes. However, Polizeiruf continues to feature more (post-reunification) East German settings than in Tatort.

A 1974 episode based on the case of serial killer Erwin Hagedorn was banned by the politburo, which feared an uncomfortable public debate about the death penalty. A script and silent tape of the episode, thought lost, were rediscovered in 2009, and the sound was re-dubbed for broadcast with new actors<ref>Cold war TV drama gets premiere, 37 years after GDR censorship in The Guardian, 24 June 2011 (retrieved 24-06-11)</ref> (the episode was aired 23 June 2011 by Mitteldeutscher Rundfunk [MDR]).

In 2014, the series was broadcast with English subtitles in the USA on MHz WorldView under the title Bukow and König (2010–2014 episodes).

Prominent cast members
Peter Borgelt as Hauptmann, later Kriminalhauptkommissar Peter Fuchs (84 episodes, 1971–1991)
Jürgen Frohriep as Oberleutnant, later Kriminaloberkommissar Jürgen Hübner (68 episodes, 1972–1994)
Sigrid Göhler as Leutnant Vera Arndt (49 episodes, 1971–2001)
Wolfgang Winkler as Hauptkommissar Herbert Schneider (50 episodes, 1979–2013)
Andreas Schmidt-Schaller as  Leutnant, Oberleutnant, later Kriminaloberkommissar Thomas Grawe (40 episodes, 1973–2004)
Jaecki Schwarz as Hauptkommissar Herbert Schmücke (together with Schneider)'' (38 episodes, 1987–2007)
Horst Krause Polizeihauptmeister Krause (35 episodes, 1987–2015)
Lutz Riemann as Oberleutnant, later Kriminaloberkommissar Lutz Zimmermann (25 episodes, 1983–1991)
Edgar Selge as Kriminalhauptkommissar Jürgen Tauber (21 episodes, 1998–2009)
Günter Naumann as Kriminalhauptkommissar Günter Beck (21 episodes, 1973–2001)
Michaela May as Kriminalhauptkommissarin Jo Obermaier (17 episodes, 2001–2009)
Imogen Kogge as Hauptkommissarin Johanna Herz (12 episodes, 2002–2010)
Henry Hübchen as Tobias Törner (5 episodes, 2003–2005)

External links

List of episodes in the German Wikipedia

References

ARD (broadcaster)
Mitteldeutscher Rundfunk
Rundfunk Berlin-Brandenburg
Ostdeutscher Rundfunk Brandenburg
German drama television series
1980s German television series
1990s German television series
2000s German television series
2010s German television series
1971 German television series debuts
German crime television series
Detective television series
1970s German police procedural television series
1980s German police procedural television series
1990s German police procedural television series
2000s German police procedural television series
2010s German police procedural television series
2020s German police procedural television series
Television in East Germany
German-language television shows
Grimme-Preis for fiction winners